Alexandros Kontos (born 12 September 1986) is a Greek professional footballer who plays as a winger.

References

1986 births
Living people
Greek footballers
Super League Greece players
Football League (Greece) players
Super League Greece 2 players
Doxa Drama F.C. players
PAS Giannina F.C. players
Kastoria F.C. players
Panserraikos F.C. players
PAE Kerkyra players
Association football wingers
Footballers from Drama, Greece